The Pegasus was an early, passenger train tender locomotive operated by the Leipzig–Dresden Railway Company or LDE. She was one of the first locomotives to be built in Germany.

History 
The PEGASUS was built in 1839, the first locomotive to be built by the Sächsische Maschinenbau-Compagnie in Chemnitz. In 1842, after a long period of trials, she was bought by the Leipzig-Dresden Railway Compagnie for 6250 talers. The unusable locomotive COLUMBUS was used in part-payment. The design of the PEGASUS was based on the English locomotive STURM.

In 1862/63 the engine was retired from the LDE.

See also 
 Royal Saxon State Railways
 List of Saxon locomotives and railbuses
 Leipzig–Dresden Railway Company

References

Sources 
 
 
 

2-2-2 locomotives
Locomotives of Saxony
Sächsische Maschinenfabrik locomotives
Early steam locomotives
Standard gauge locomotives of Germany
Passenger locomotives